Fifth Eskadra is a 1984 video game published by Simulations Canada.

Gameplay
Fifth Eskadra is a game in which a modern naval war is simulated.

Reception
William Highfield reviewed the game for Computer Gaming World, and stated that "The release of FE convinces me that Simulations Canada will be climbing in importance in the computer simulation field."

References

External links

Review in GAMES Magazine
Review in InCider
Review in Tilt

1984 video games
Apple II games
Commodore 64 games
Computer wargames
Cold War video games
Naval video games
Simulations Canada video games
Turn-based strategy video games
Video games developed in Canada
Video games set in Europe